John I (15 May 1459 – 27 January 1509) was the Count Palatine of Simmern from 1480 until 1509.

John was born in 1459 to Frederick I, Count Palatine of Simmern. He married Joanna of Nassau-Saarbrücken (1464 - 1521) the daughter of Johann II of Nassau-Saarbrücken on 29 September 1481. John died in Starkenburg in 1509 and was buried in Simmern.

Children
With Joanna of Nassau-Saarbrücken (1464 - 1521) (14 April 1464 – 7 May 1521)
Frederick (1490)
John II (21 March 1492 – 18 May 1557)
Frederick (1494–?)

References

House of Wittelsbach
1459 births
1509 deaths